Amsactoides guangxica is a moth of the family Erebidae. It was described by Vladimir Viktorovitch Dubatolov and Yasunori Kishida in 2009. It is found in Guangxi, China.

References

Moths described in 2009
Spilosomina
Moths of Asia